Sing Tao Sports Club is a now defunct Hong Kong football club which was dissolved after the 1998–99 season. The club was established by Aw Hoe, a director of Sing Tao Daily in 1940. The first team made their first appearance in the first division in the 1940–41 season. The team relegated to the second division twice, in 1962–63 and 1972–73 seasons respectively. The club turned professional in the 1968–69 season. They were promoted back to the first division again in 1987–88 and stayed until it was dissolved in 1999 by Sing Tao Limited, at that time a subsidiary of Sing Tao Holdings.

Honours

League
 Hong Kong First Division
Champions (1): 1946–47

Cup
 Hong Kong Senior Shield
Champions (6): 1946–47, 1947–48, 1951–52, 1966–67, 1969–70, 1991–92
 Hong Kong Viceroy Cup:
Champions (2): 1994–95, 1996–97

Former players
1. Players that have played/managed in a fully professional league.
2. Players with full international caps.
 Ricky Reina
 Ralph Milne
 Hsu King
 Jamie Southon
 Glyn Hodges
 Andy Kennedy
 Rudi Hedman

References
 香港足球總會九十週年紀念特刊
ADO Den Haag statistieken tegen Sing Tao in 1947 
 ADO Den Haag – Sing Tao wedstrijdverslag 1947 

 
Association football clubs established in 1940
Association football clubs disestablished in 1999
Football clubs in Hong Kong
Defunct football clubs in Hong Kong
1940 establishments in Hong Kong
1999 disestablishments in Hong Kong
Aw family
Sing Tao News Corporation
Works association football clubs in Hong Kong